Rajinder "Raj" Saini (born August 21, 1967) is an Indian-Canadian politician who served as the Member of Parliament (MP) for the riding of Kitchener Centre in the House of Commons of Canada from 2015 to 2021.

Background
Saini's political leanings were formed growing up in a Liberal household in Mississauga in the 1970s and 1980s, and later as a student at the University of Toronto, where he completed a bachelor of science before going on to complete a Bachelor of Science in pharmacy at Boston's Northeastern University.

Early career
Prior to becoming a Member of Parliament, Saini was a pharmacist, having moved to Kitchener to start Greenbrook Pharmacy, a local independent business which he has co-owned and operated for more than 20 years. Prior to becoming an elected official, Saini had long been involved in both his community and the Liberal Party. He is a past president and past vice-president of the Kitchener Centre Federal Liberal Association, a Rotarian, and has served as a member of the Canadian International Council, Waterloo.

Political career
Saini was first elected to Parliament in the 2015 federal election. He said that one of his top priorities for his time in Ottawa would be addressing Canada's need for a national pharmacare policy. He was a member of two parliamentary committees, the Foreign Affairs and International Development Committee, as well as the Access to Information, Privacy, and Ethics Committee. Reflecting an interest in Foreign Affairs, Saini was a member of multiple Parliamentary Associations and Parliamentary Friendship Groups, including the Canada-Europe Parliamentary Association, the Canada-Israel Interparliamentary Group, the Canada-United States Inter-Parliamentary Group, the Canadian Branch of the Commonwealth Parliamentary Association (CPA), the Canadian Delegation to the Organization for Security and Co-operation in Europe Parliamentary Assembly (OSCE PA), and the Canadian NATO Parliamentary Association (NATO PA). He was also an executive member of the Canada-Germany Interparliamentary Group.

Saini spoke in the House of Commons on topics including the International Day for Tolerance, Public Safety Canada, the National Security and Intelligence Committee of Parliamentarians, and Canada's efforts to combat ISIL.

Sexual harassment allegations
In 2021, allegations emerged that Saini engaged in inappropriate behaviour including unwanted sexual advances towards female staffers on four occasions. On September 4, Saini announced he was ending his campaign for re-election, denying any wrongdoing. Saini did not withdraw his candidacy prior to the close of nominations and his name remained on the ballot as the Liberal candidate for the September 20 vote.

Regarding the alleged incidents, Saini had been cleared of wrongdoing by a workplace assessment independently commissioned by the House of Commons in the spring of 2020. The workplace assessment concluded that the staffer making the allegations was "creating a toxic environment and many staff and the MP report strained relationships with her" and recommended that "the employment relationship may need to be reconsidered ... in order to ensure a safe and healthy work environment for the remainder of the staff." The staffer who made the allegations had her employment terminated with cause in August 2020 by the House of Commons. Saini was advised to seek a restraining order against the staffer by the Office of the Law Clerk and Parliamentary Counsel, though he refused.

Electoral record

References

Living people
Members of the House of Commons of Canada from Ontario
Liberal Party of Canada MPs
Year of birth uncertain
University of Toronto alumni
Northeastern University alumni
Businesspeople from Kitchener, Ontario
Canadian pharmacists
Politicians from Kitchener, Ontario
Canadian politicians of Punjabi descent
Canadian politicians of Indian descent
21st-century Canadian politicians
1967 births